Gongmao may refer to:

 Qing Guanmao, Qing official headwear, the headwear of officials during the Qing Dynasty in China
 Gongmao Station, Chongqing, China
 Liu Zi's courtesy name